Paulo Monteiro may refer to:

 Paulo Monteiro (footballer, born 1985), Portuguese footballer who plays for AD Fafe as a central defender
 Paulo Monteiro (footballer, born 1991), Portuguese footballer who plays for S.C. Freamunde as a left back
 Paulo Monteiro (artist) (born 1961), Brazilian artist